The Edron Academy (El Colegio Británico) A.C. is a non-profit school British international school located in Álvaro Obregón, Mexico City. 

The Edron Academy was founded in 1963, being the oldest British international bicultural   school in Mexico City.

The school is open to students from 18 months to 18 years of age and has approximately 1000 students.

School structure 

The school is split between two campuses on either side of Avenida Desierto de los Leones. The kindergarten is located in the original hacienda building with the primary and secondary schools being located on the opposite side of the road.

Education system
 
Kinder

Students in the kindergarten follow the English National Curriculum, following the Early Years Foundation Stage framework and into Key Stage 1
Students follow the Mexican curriculum as stipulated by the Secretariat of Public Education (SEP) alongside the English curriculum.

Primary
 
Students in the primary school study a bespoke combination of the English National Curriculum alongside the Mexican curriculum.

Secondary

Students in the secondary school study the English National Curriculum in years 7 to 9 (key stage 3 link) and IGCSE in years 10 and 11 with the final examinations taken at the end of year 11.

History
It was founded in 1963 by Edward Foulkes, a Welshman who worked in Mexico in the publishing business and as a teacher for the British Council, and by Ronald Stech, a Canadian who became the school's first administrator. Foulkes, who had previously founded Greengates School, had left by 1961, selling his share to Henry Coehlo.

In 1985, it moved from San Ángel to its present site in a residential area close to the forested hills of Desierto de los Leones. At the same time, it achieved its bicultural status through incorporation with the Mexican education authority.

In 1995 the Edron became an IB world school.

In September 2014, The Edron Academy went under an inspection carried out by the Independent Schools Inspectorate (ISI). The findings of the inspection were very positive, and The Edron Academy became the first school to meet the stringent standards laid down by the British Government for independent schools in the country. In addition, The Edron Academy became the first COBIS Accredited Member school in México and successfully passed a COBIS accreditation inspection in 2019.

Associations & Accreditations
The Edron Academy is accredited nationally and internationally by:

National Autonomous University of Mexico (UNAM or Universidad Nacional Autónoma de México)
Secretariat of Public Education (SEP or Secretaría de Educación Pública)
International Baccalaureate (IB)
The International General Certificate of Secondary Education (IGCSE)
 The Council of British International Schools (COBIS)
 The Duke of Edinburgh's Award

Notable alumni 
 Ximbo (born 1979), musician
 Jennifer Clement (born 1960), writer
 Karla Cossío (born 1985), actress
 Khotan Fernández (born 1973), actor
 Gael García Bernal (born 1978), actor and director
 Alfonso Herrera (born 1983), actor and musician
 DBC Pierre (born 1961), writer
 Gabriel Soto (born 1975), actor and model
 Ximena Sariñana (born 1986), actress and musician
 Eiza González (born 1990), actress and musician
 José María de Tavira (born 1983) actor and director
 Mario Iván Martínez (born 1962) actor
 Ana Victoria (born 1983) musician and singer

References

External links 

 Official site
 IGCSE Official Site

British international schools in Mexico
International schools in Mexico City
High schools in Mexico City
Álvaro Obregón, Mexico City
International Baccalaureate schools in Mexico
Private schools in Mexico
Educational institutions established in 1963
1963 establishments in Mexico